Mohan Kupleri
(born 19 June, 1957) is an Indian film director in Malayalam cinema, Television Serials and Advertising Films. He made his debut cinema with Grihaprevesam (1992). His films include Nandini Oppol (1994), Kaathil Oru Kinnaram (1996), Dravidan (1998), Kattathoru Penpoovu (1998), Savithriyude Aranjanam (2002), Payum Puli (2007), Evadaina Sare (Telugu language) (2007), Grihanathan (2012) and upcoming film Chandragiri.

Biography
His native place is Payyanur, Kannur District, Kerala state. Presently Mohan Kupleri is staying in Thiruvananthapuram. He is married to Rajasree. The couple have one daughter, Dr. Ambili Saikiran and one son, Akhil Mohan.

He got into the world of cinema by assisting noted director Adoor Gopalakrishnan. He worked with Adoor Gopalakrishnan movies like Elippathayam, Mukhamukham, Anantaram etc. which won lot of national and international awards.

Mohan Kupleri has also scripted and directed commercial advertising films.

He directed several popular serials in Malayalam Television industry. Some of his notable serials are Swaram which won the Television Critics' Award for best serial in 2006 (Amrita TV), 'Kattukurangu'- Kerala Film Critics Award for Best Director, Kerala State Television Award for best 2nd serial,  Swantham (Asianet), Dhannyam (Asianet), Charulatha (Surya TV), Indulekha (Surya TV), M.T Kathakal (Amrita TV), Kattukurangu (Amrita TV), Kallyanasougandhikam (Asianet), Athmasakhi (Mazhavil Manorama) etc. etc.

Filmography

As director

As Unit or Asst. Director

Television

References

21st-century Indian film directors
Living people
Malayalam film directors
People from Kannur district
1957 births
20th-century Indian film directors
Film directors from Kerala